This is a list of J/80 sailboat world championship results.

Editions

References

J/80
World championships in sailing